Andrei Mikhailovich Bochkov (born 13 January 1982) is a former Russian footballer.

External links
  Player page on the official FC Shinnik Yaroslavl website
 

1982 births
Living people
Russian footballers
Association football midfielders
FC Olimpia Volgograd players
FC Elista players
FC Rostov players
FC Shinnik Yaroslavl players
Russian Premier League players
FC Luch Vladivostok players
FC Ural Yekaterinburg players
Sportspeople from Volgograd
FC Tosno players
FC Sakhalin Yuzhno-Sakhalinsk players
FC Volgar Astrakhan players
FC Neftekhimik Nizhnekamsk players